Karreh Bas (also Romanized as Kareh Bas; also known as Qarābast and Qareh Bast) is a village in Kuh Mareh Sorkhi Rural District, Arzhan District, Shiraz County, Fars Province, Iran. At the 2006 census, its population was 353, in 73 families.

References 

Populated places in Shiraz County